V liga represents the sixth level of the Polish football hierarchy. Teams promoted from V liga move up to IV liga, whilst relegated teams descend to the regional league. Currently, this league is present only in the Greater Poland (Wielkopolskie), Lesser Poland (Małopolskie) and Masovian (Mazowieckie) voivodeships.

Team overview

V liga, group I
 Huragan Pobiedziska
 Pogoń Łobżenica
 Zamek Gołańcz
 Noteć Czarnków
 Sparta Oborniki
 Wełna Skoki
 Polonia Chodzież
 Sparta Szamotuły
 Czarni Czerniejewo 
 Błękitni Wronki
 Orkan Śmiłowo
 Płomień Połajewo
 Sparta Złotów
 Leśnik Margonin
 Concordia Murowana Goślina
 Lechia Kostrzyn
 Lechita Kłecko
 GLKS Wysoka

V liga, group II
 Korona Piaski
 Przemysław Poznań
 Rawia Rawicz
 Lipno Stęszew
 KKS Wiara Lecha Poznań
 Orkan Chorzemin
 Promień Krzywiń
 Kania Gostyń
 Grom Plewiska
 Sokół Pniewy
 PKS Racot
 Stella Luboń
 AP Reissa Poznań
 Patria Buk
 Pogoń Śmigiel
 Grom Wolsztyn
 Płomień Przyprostynia
 Piast Poniec

V liga, group III
 Orzeł Mroczeń
 Victoria Skarszew
 Polonus Kazimierz Biskupi
 SKP Słupca
 Vitcovia Witkowo
 Piast Kobylin
  KS Opatówek
 Zefka Kobyla Góra
 Stal Pleszew
 GKS Rychtal
 MKS Dąbie
 Raszkowianka Raszków
 GKS Sompolno
 Astra Krotoszyn
 Zjednoczeni Rychwał
 Piast Czekanów
 Tulisia Tuliszków
 Lew Pogorzela

Champions of V liga

Notes

References

External links
 Ligi regionalne 2020–21 

6
Poland